Munir Abu-Keshek is an amateur boxer from Palestine.

He won a bronze medal at Light heavyweight at the 2002 Asian Games. In doing so he became the first Palestinian to medal at those games.

References 

Year of birth missing (living people)
Living people
Palestinian male boxers
Asian Games medalists in boxing
Boxers at the 1998 Asian Games
Boxers at the 2002 Asian Games
Asian Games bronze medalists for Palestine
Medalists at the 2002 Asian Games
Light-heavyweight boxers